Bonnie Anne Perry (born April 15, 1962) is a bishop in the Episcopal Church in the United States of America. She was elected the Diocese of Michigan's eleventh diocesan bishop on June 1, 2019, which made her the first woman and first openly lesbian priest elected as an Episcopal bishop in Michigan.

Early life
Perry was born to parents Ray and Mary Jane Perry in San Diego, California as the oldest of four children in a military family. Raised in a devout Roman Catholic family, Perry attended the College of the Holy Cross, but after feeling that she had a call to the priesthood, converted to the Episcopal faith which unlike the Roman Catholic Church allows women clergy. She then attended Union Theological Seminary, where she met her future spouse Susan Harlow.

Education
Perry was awarded a Bachelor of Arts in biology in 1984 from College of the Holy Cross, Worcester, Massachusetts. In 1988 she earned a Master of Divinity degree from Union Theological Seminary in New York, NY. In 1998 she earned a Doctorate of Ministry specializing in Congregational Development from Seabury-Western Theological Seminary, Evanston, IL.

Ministry
Perry was ordained a deacon on June 2, 1990, then as a priest on December 15, 1990, in the Diocese of Newark by Bishop John Shelby Spong. She served as Associate Rector for Christ Church in Ridgewood NJ from 1989 to 1991, then Interim Rector for St. Peter's Episcopal Church, Clifton NJ from September 1991 to October 1992. She served as Congregational Development Vicar for All Saints Episcopal Church, Chicago from 1992 to 2000, then as their rector from 2000 to 2019.

She was a candidate for Bishop of Minnesota in 2009.

Bishop of Michigan 
In 2019, Perry was elected the Diocese of Michigan's eleventh diocesan bishop. She was consecrated on February 8, 2020, by Michael Curry.

See also
 List of Episcopal bishops of the United States
 Historical list of the Episcopal bishops of the United States

References

External links
 Web site of the Episcopal Church
 Web site of the Diocese of Michigan

Clergy from Detroit
People from Chicago
Episcopal bishops of Michigan
Living people
American Episcopalians
Converts to Anglicanism from Roman Catholicism
1962 births
LGBT Anglican bishops
Women Anglican bishops
College of the Holy Cross alumni
Union Theological Seminary (New York City) alumni
21st-century LGBT people